Woomargama is a locality in southwestern New South Wales, Australia. The locality is in the South West Slopes region, in the foothills of the Great Dividing Range.

The village has a hotel/motel, post office situated in the historic school building, community hall, fire station, tennis courts & park with BBQ and public conveniences, and a town common. The village is ideally situated to access Woomargama National Park and the upper Murray River.

Woomargama Post Office opened on 1 August 1875.

Woomargama bypass
Woomargama bypass opened to traffic in November 2011. The Woomargama bypass is to the west of the town, linking-up with the dual carriageways to the north and south of the town.

References

External links

Towns in the Riverina
Towns in New South Wales